Mamasakhlisi is also a Georgian surname
Mamasakhlisi was a title of the Georgian rulers.

Mamasakhlisi literally means "Father of the House", მამა (mama) meaning "father" and სახლი (sakhli) meaning "house".

See also 
Eristavi
Batoni
Aznauri
Mtavari

References

Further reading
სურგულაძე ი., მამასახლისობის ინსტიტუტის შესახებ, „მაცნე ფილოსოფიის ფსიქოლოგიის, ეკონომიკისა და სამართლის სერია“, 1972, № 4; მისივე, საქართველოს სახელმწიფოსა და სამართლის ისტორიისათვის, ტ. 1, თბ., 1952;
შანიძე ა., მამასახლისი XI საუკუნის საქართველოში, „მაცნე. ენისა და ლიტერატურის სერია“, 1971, № 1;
ჯავახიშვილი ივ., ქართული სამართლის ისტორია, წგნ., 1, ტფ., 1928; წგნ. 2, ნაკვ. 1, ტფ., 1928;
სურგულაძე ი., ქართული საბჭოთა ენციკლოპედია, ტ. 6, გვ. 394, თბ., 1983 წელი.

Georgian words and phrases
Honorifics
Heads of state
Titles
Positions of authority
History of Georgia (country)
Georgian-language surnames